A kettle (also known as a kettle lake, kettle pond, kettle hole, or pothole) is a depression or hole in an outwash plain formed by retreating glaciers or draining floodwaters. The kettles are formed as a result of blocks of dead ice left behind by retreating glaciers, which become surrounded by sediment deposited by meltwater streams as there is increased friction. The ice becomes buried in the sediment and when the ice melts, a depression is left called a kettle hole, creating a dimpled appearance on the outwash plain. Lakes often fill these kettles; these are called kettle hole lakes. Another source is the sudden drainage of an ice-dammed lake. When the block melts, the hole it leaves behind is a kettle. As the ice melts, ramparts can form around the edge of the kettle hole. In acid conditions, a kettle bog may form but in alkaline conditions, it will be kettle peatland.

Overview

Kettles are fluvioglacial landforms occurring as the result of blocks of ice calving from the front of a receding glacier and becoming partially to wholly buried by glacial outwash. Glacial outwash is generated when streams of meltwater flow away from the glacier and deposit sediment to form broad outwash plains called sandurs. When the ice blocks melt, kettle holes are left in the sandur. When the development of numerous kettle holes disrupt sandur surfaces, a jumbled array of ridges and mounds form, resembling kame and kettle topography. Kettle holes can also occur in ridge shaped deposits of loose rock fragments called till.

Kettle holes can form as the result of floods caused by the sudden drainage of an ice-dammed lake. These floods, called jökulhlaups, often rapidly deposit large quantities of sediment onto the sandur surface. The kettle holes are formed by the melting blocks of sediment-rich ice that were transported and consequently buried by the jökulhlaups. It was found in field observations and laboratory simulations done by Maizels in 1992 that ramparts form around the edge of kettle holes generated by jökulhlaups. The development of distinct types of ramparts depends on the concentration of rock fragments contained in the melted ice block and on how deeply the block was buried by sediment.

Most kettle holes are less than two kilometres in diameter, although some in the U.S. Midwest exceed ten kilometres. Puslinch Lake in Ontario, Canada, is the largest kettle lake in Canada spanning .

The depth of most kettles is less than ten meters.  In most cases, kettle holes eventually fill with water, sediment, or vegetation. If the kettle is fed by surface or underground rivers or streams, it becomes a kettle lake. If the kettle receives its water from precipitation, the groundwater table, or a combination of the two, it is termed a kettle pond or kettle wetland, if vegetated. Kettle ponds that are not affected by the groundwater table will usually become dry during the warm summer months, in which case they are deemed ephemeral.

Bogs
If water in a kettle becomes acidic due to decomposing organic plant matter, it becomes a kettle bog; or, if underlying soils are lime-based and neutralize the acidic conditions somewhat, it becomes a kettle peatland. Kettle bogs are closed ecosystems because they have no water source other than precipitation. Acidic kettle bogs and fresh water kettles are important ecological niches for some symbiotic species of flora and fauna.

The Kettle Moraine, a region of Wisconsin covering an area from Green Bay to south-central Wisconsin, has numerous kettles, moraines and other glacial features.

Examples
The Prairie Pothole Region extends from northern Alberta, Canada to Iowa, United States and includes thousands of small sloughs and lakes.

Austria
Meerauge, Bodental
Zmulner See, Carinthia (Kärnten)
Canada
Ontario
Algonquin Park, Spruce Bog trail
 Bond Lake
Heart Lake
Kettle Lakes Provincial Park
Lake Wilcox
Musselman Lake
Preston Lake
Puslinch Lake
New Brunswick
MacLaren Pond, Fundy National Park
Finland
 Syvyydenkaivo, Rokua National Park
Germany
 Eggstätter Seen, Bayern
 Müggelsee, Berlin
 Oberwaldbacher See, Bayern
 Osterseen, Bayern
 Schluisee, Bayern
 Seeoner Seen, Bayern
 Teupitzer See, Brandenburg
 Tüttensee, Bayern
 Ukleisee, Schleswig-Holstein
 Weisser See, Berlin
India
 Sela Pass, Arunachal Pradesh
New Zealand
 Lake Matheson
United Kingdom
England
Aqualate Mere, Staffordshire
Barelees Pond, Northumberland
Breckland, Norfolk/Suffolk called pingo ponds.
Bomere Pool, Shropshire
Campfield Kettle Hole, Northumberland
Hatchmere, Cheshire
Talkin Tarn, Cumbria
Tarn Wadling, Cumbria
Wormingford Mere, Essex
Scotland
Belston Loch
Blae Loch
Helenton Loch
Loch Brown
Loch Fergus
Loch Morlich
United States
Illinois
Volo Bog
Indiana
Pinhook Bog
Iowa
Clear Lake
Massachusetts
Cliff Pond
Fresh Pond
Jamaica Pond
Houghton's Pond
Scargo Lake
Spy Pond
Walden Pond 
Michigan
Heart Lake
Tee Lake
Thumb Lake
Walled Lake
New Hampshire
Philbrick-Cricenti Bog
Ponemah Bog
Spruce Hole Bog
New York
Artist Lake
Lake Success
Mendon Ponds
Ronkonkoma Lake
Round Lake, Saratoga County
Ohio
Brady Lake
Calamus Swamp
Lake Anna, Barberton Ohio
Lake Kelso
Stage's Pond State Nature Preserve
Triangle Lake Bog, Ravenna
Pennsylvania
Conneaut Lake
Rhode Island
Ell Pond
Washington
Fish Lake
Whidbey Island
Wisconsin
Elkhart Lake
Mauthe Lake
Kettle Moraine
Venezuela
 Kettle Mucubají

See also
:Category:Kettle lakes
Glacial landforms
Pothole (landform)
Pingo
Pond
Kame

References

Further reading

 Geology of Ice Age National Scientific Reserve of Wisconsin NPS Scientific Monograph No. 2
 The genesis of the northern Kettle Moraine, Wisconsin - PDF
 Geology of the Adirondack Park

 Portnoy, J.W. et al.,  Kettle Pond Data Atlas for Cape Cod National Seashore: Paleoecology and Modern Water Chemistry April 2001, 118 pp., Retrieved June 23, 2018.

Depressions (geology)
Glaciology
Glacial landforms
 Kettle